Ramon Folc de Cardona i Anglesola (Italian: Raimondo di Cardona) (1467 – 10 March 1522) was a Catalan general and politician, who served as the viceroy of Naples during the Italian Wars and commanded the Spanish forces in Italy during the War of the League of Cambrai. He was granted the title count of Oliveto in the Kingdom of Naples, on 12 December 1515.

Biography 
The son of Antoni de Cardona-Anglesola i Centelles and Castellana de Requesens, he was 5th Baron of Bellpuig, Baron of Linyola and Baron of Utxafava, all three places in Catalonia. Ramón de Cardona  was born in Bellpuig, to one of the greatest families in the Crown of Aragon, the Cardona. On 12 December 1502 he was awarded the title of Duke of Soma, taking part in 1505, with the role of admiral, in the capture of Mers-el-Kébir.

King Ferdinand II of Aragon, of whom he has been postulated to be a natural son, made him Viceroy of Naples in 1509. He stayed as Viceroy of Sicily from 1507 to 1509 and coming back to Naples and staying there till his death in 1522. In 1510 he received instructions on introducing the Inquisition in Naples, a decision which caused a popular revolt; after which the Spanish king canceled the decree.

   
In 1511 Cardona moved to northern Italy as the commander-in-chief of the League of Cambrai army, leaving the Neapolitan government to his wife Isabel de Requesens, 2nd countess of Palamós,  2nd countess of Avellino,  2nd countess of Trivento, baroness of Calonge, daughter of Galceran de Requesens the first holder of these titles.

In the following year he was defeated by Gaston of Foix, Duke of Nemours at the Battle of Ravenna. Cardona then moved to Tuscany to support the then  Spanish-supported House of Medici. His troops besieged Prato, massacring the population after its fall.

In 1513 Cardona returned to Lombardy with a new army the following year and fought successfully at the Battle of La Motta, defeating the Venetian army led by Bartolomeo d'Alviano. He was however unable to prevent the Venetians from joining with the French at the Battle of Marignano.

In February 1513, after the death of  Pope Julius II, (1443–1513), a.k.a. Giuliano della Rovere  and the arrival in Italy of King Francis I of France, Cardona was called back to Spain. In 1515 he had received the title of Count of Alvito, a fiefdom in what is now southern Lazio. In 1519 the new king of Spain, Charles I of Spain, a.k.a. Charles V, Holy Roman Emperor, made him Great Admiral of the Kingdom of Naples.

He died at Naples in 1522. His cenotaph in Bellpuig, executed by Giovanni da Nola, is one of the most outstanding examples of Renaissance art in the region.

Children 

He had two children :
 Fernando Folch de Cardona, 2nd duke of Soma, 3rd count of Oliveto, 2nd duke of Soma and other titles, Viceroy of Sicily, deceased 13 September 1571. 
 Caterina de Cardona y Requesens, deceased in 1577, married Don Ferrante d' Aragona, 1st duke of Montalto, illegitimate son of King Ferrante I of Naples and Diana Guardato. Their descendants were the "Moncada" family, Sicilian Princes of Paternò and Grandees of Spain.

Notes

References
 
 
http://www.grandesp.org.uk/historia/gzas/soma.htm

External links  

1467 births
1522 deaths
People from Urgell
Military leaders of the Italian Wars
Viceroys of Naples
Viceroys of Sicily
16th-century Neapolitan people